Guido Mazzinghi (14 May 1932 – 6 October 1996) was an Italian middleweight boxer. He competed in the 1952 Summer Olympics, but was eliminated in the third bout. In 1954 he turned professional and retired in 1957 as a reigning Italian champion with a record of 35 wins out of 36 bouts. His younger brother Alessandro was also a professional boxer.

References

External links
 

1932 births
1996 deaths
Olympic boxers of Italy
People from Pontedera
Italian male boxers
Boxers at the 1952 Summer Olympics
Middleweight boxers
Sportspeople from the Province of Pisa
20th-century Italian people